Tiruchirappalli (West) is a state legislative assembly in Tamil Nadu that was previously called Tiruchirappalli – I Assembly constituency before the constituency delimitations in the year 2008. Its State Assembly Constituency number is 140. Tiruchirappalli West will be one of 17 assembly constituencies to have VVPAT facility with EVMs in 2016 Tamil Nadu Legislative Assembly election.
It comes under Tiruchirappalli Lok Sabha constituency for Parliament elections. It includes Ward Nos. 39- 60 of Tiruchirappalli City Municipal Corporation .

It is one of the 234 State Legislative Assembly Constituencies in Tamil Nadu.

The Mukkulathor community (mostly Kallar) is the biggest community in this constituency with around 25% population.

The population of other communities are: 15% Muslims, 15% Paraiyar, 10% Devendra Kula Vellalar, Vellalar 10% and Mutharaiyar 5%.

Thr constituency has around 10% Telugu speaking population.

In the 2021 MLA election, the DMK party's Reddy candidate K.N Nehru won against the Kallar candidate of AIADMK.

K.N Nehru of Reddy community was fielded as the compromising candidate as Muslims and Paraiyars have 15% population each and Devendrars and Vellalars have 10% each.

He was also made as minister of Municipal Administration and Water Supply, which is one of the most powerful minister portfolios.

It is said that he was made minister as a compromising community candidate, because the Tiruchi district has various Tamil castes, namely Vellalar, Mutharaiyar, Kallar, Devendrar and Paraiyar with substantial population.

Members of Legislative Assembly

Election Results

2021

2016

2011 Bypolls

2011

References 

Assembly constituencies of Tamil Nadu
Government of Tiruchirappalli